Dasty or Dispy was a village in Badakhshan Province, Afghanistan. It was destroyed by an avalanche on March 3, 2012.

References

Badakhshan Province